The electronics industry in Bangladesh is one of the fastest-growing industries in the country with great potential. Popular Bangladeshi electronics brands include Walton Electronics, Singer Bangladesh, Jamuna Electronics, Vision Electronics (PRAN-RFL Group). Local companies such as Fair Group, Butterfly Group, Electra, Rangs Group, Electro Mart, and Transcom Group manufacture and assembles Electronics Home Appliances in collaboration with foreign brands such as Samsung, Whirlpool, LG, Sony, Gree, Konka, and Sharp.

History

Home appliances

The use of electronics in Bangladesh started in the 1930s through the field of communication with the establishment of radio stations, telephone exchanges and wireless communication. During World War II, to satisfy military needs, the technology of wireless communication was enhanced and the latest technology was introduced in British Raj.

In 1950, consumer electronics industry made an inception in the private sector and a few assembly plants were set up to produce a limited number of radio sets. In the 1960s more assembly plants were established. In 1964, with the establishment of the first television station in Dhaka, some of these plants started assembling television sets. A digital telephone system was introduced in 1983 and mobile phones came in 1992. Before 1980, most of the domestic appliances and equipments were imported, except the one-band radio, but after 1980 many assembly plants for radio, television, audio and video cassette recorders and players were established.

Since 1990, advanced products like computers, cordless telephones, satellite TV signal receiving equipment etc. started to be assembled and some spare parts also began to be manufactured. By this time, a number of multinational companies have set up assembly and manufacturing plants in the country. Local companies in joint collaboration with foreign companies have established assembly and manufacturing plants. At present the total number of such companies is more than sixty. Since 1994, after Bangladesh's integration into the free market agreement, all kinds of commodities including electronic products began to be imported freely, which created a competitive environment. By the 2000s,Revolution started and few local companies began to export locally manufactured electronic home appliances abroad. Walton, Jamuna Electronics, Marcel, Vision, ViGO, Minister etc. were the frontier leaders to start manufacture of electronic goods in Bangladesh. After Walton, many other local companies started manufacture electronic home appliances in the country. Walton introduced country's first compressor manufacturing plant in April, 2017. In 2017, Samsung inaugurated two home appliances manufacturing plant in Bangladesh, in a collaboration with Fair Electronics and Transcom Electronics. In 2018, LG Electronics inaugurated TV manufacturing plant in Bangladesh, in a collaboration Butterfly Group. LG also plans to open a Refrigerator and Air Conditioner manufacturing plant in 2019. Japanese electronics brand Sharp and Fujitsu General home appliances also started their journey in Bangladesh with a local conglomerate, Esquire Electronics..

Smartphones and high technology industries
On 5 October 2017, local giant Walton inaugurated the country's first ever smartphone and tablet manufacturing plant named "Walton Digi-Tech Industries". Made in Bangladesh labeled smartphones made by Walton arrived at market in January, 2018.

On 18 January 2018, Walton launched the country's first Computer and Laptop manufacturing plant.

In April 2018, Samsung announced assembling of smartphones in Bangladesh in their new factory in a collaboration with Fair Electronics and the factory commenced production of smartphones in May, 2018. Bangladeshi assembled Galaxy Note 10 | 10+ | 10 Lite reached at market in January, 2020. They will start full-fledged manufacturing of Samsung smartphones from the quadrant of 2020.

In October 2018, Transsion Bangladesh Limited, Bangladeshi subsidiary of Transsion Holdings, started producing smartphones in their new manufacturing factory in Bangladesh. Transsion started producing smartphones by assembling components and gradually shifted to full-fledged manufacturing of the phones labeling "Made in Bangladesh".

Country's 5th mobile factory was launched in October by “5 Star Mobile” brand. Few more companies are also setting up their smartphone factories in Bangladesh, which will come into production in the first quadrant of 2019. International brands like Xiaomi, Huawei, Lava have shown their interests to set up smartphone manufacturing plants in Bangladesh within the next couple of years.

In July 2019, Vivo inaugurated their new manufacturing plant in Rupganj Upazila, Narayanganj.

In November 2019 Global smartphone brand Oppo launched their new manufacturing plant in Gazipur under the company name of Benli Electronic Enterprise Co Limited, which is also their 10th global manufacturing plant.

In February 2020, Realme inaugurated their new smartphone manufacturing plant in Gazipur.

In September 2021, Nokia started production of smartphones in their new manufacturing plant in a collaboration with Vibrant Software Bangladesh Ltd in Bangabandhu Hi-Tech City, Gazipur.

In October 2021, Xiaomi opened their first Bangladeshi manufacturing plant in Gazipur, partnering with DBG Technology BD Ltd, an electronics manufacturing service provider headquartered at Huizhou, Guangdong in China.

Market size
As of November 2020, the industry was estimated to be worth , with a yearly growth rate of 11%.

Electronics manufacturing plants in Bangladesh

See also

References

External links